Ethyl hydroperoxide is the organic compound with the formula CH3CH2OOH.  It is a colorless liquid that is miscible with water and diethyl ether.

Formation
Ethyl hydroperoxide is formed in the flame of burning alkanes. Ethyl hydroperoxide is also formed in the catalytic reaction of ethane and hydrogen peroxide. Yet another way to form ethyl hydroperoxide is by a photocatalytic oxidation of ethane:
CH3CH3 + O2 → CH3CH2OOH

References

Hydroperoxides
Oxidizing agents